Vasantha Mullai is a 2023 Indian Tamil-language psychological action thriller film written and directed by Ramanan Purushothama, and produced by Rajani Talluri and Reshmi Menon under, SRT Entertainment and Mudhra's Film Factory. It features Bobby Simha and Kashmira Pardeshi in the lead roles.

Sypnopsis
Rudhran, a man who works tirelessly for a successful career and money, embarks on a romantic journey to spend quality time with his girlfriend, Nila. On the way, he stays at the Vasantha Mullai Motel which takes him on a roller coaster ride.

Cast 
 Bobby Simha as Rudhran
 Kashmira Pardeshi as Nila
 Arya (guest appearance; Tamil version)
 Rakshit Shetty (guest appearance; Kannada version)
 Kochu Preman
 Sarath Babu as Doctor
 Rama Prabha
 Mona Bedre

Production 
The project was announced in November 2019, with shoot beginning during the following month. The film was largely shot by November 2020 across Vagamon and Chennai. In the Tamil version, Arya was signed to portray a guest role, while Rakshit Shetty performed the same role of the Kannada version.

Soundtrack
Soundtrack was composed by Rajesh Murugesan.
Avalo Avalo - Gowtham Bharadwaj
Vaanmegam - Vijay Yesudas, Shakthisree Gopalan
Theeratha Raakaalam - Arivu
Kondridu Vaazhave - Sivam
Naan Yaar - Rajesh Murugesan

Marketing
The first look poster of the film was released by Dhanush in November 2020. Second look was released on February 2021.

Reception 
A critic from Times of India noted "Bobby Simha tries his best to save this mediocre thriller", adding " the idea that it adopts is decent enough to grab the attention of the viewers", "but then, mediocre storyline and unrealistic conflicts make this an average watch". A reviewer from Cinema Express wrote "this well-shot film needed invested writing".

References

External links 
 

 2020s Tamil-language films
Indian supernatural films
Indian psychological thriller films